Ministry of Finance and Economic Development may refer to:

 Ministry of Finance and Economic Development (Ethiopia)
 Ministry of Finance and Economic Development (Kiribati) 
 Ministry of Finance and Economic Development (Mauritius)
 Sierra Leone Ministry of Finance and Economic Development